Muchacha italiana viene a casarse (Italian girl comes to get married) is a 1971 Mexican telenovela by Televisa produced by Ernesto Alonso and directed by Alfredo Saldaña, starring Angélica María and Ricardo Blume. Writing credits belong to Delia González Marquez (original story), Fernanda Villeli (adaptation), Marissa Garrido (adaptation), Miguel Sabido (adaptation) and Carlos Lozano Dana (adaptation)

The series featured two theme songs: "A dónde va nuestro amor" and "Lo que sabemos del amor". Both songs were written by Eduardo Magallanes and performed by Angélica María.

Plot
Valeria and Gianna Donatti lived happily in Naples with his father, until he suddenly gets ill and dies, then the sisters must travel to Mexico City to meet with Vittorio Maglione, the fiance to Valeria. Valeria and Vittorio have never been seen since their marriage was arranged by her parents; so the two have no idea have no idea of how they appear. Believing Valeria will never arrive, Vittorio (the impatient fool he is) stops waiting.

Valeria and Gianna are lost in the city, when they get robbed and are practically on the street, at nightfall the concierge of a luxury apartment complex gives them stay in her room, finally gives Valeria Vittorio disappointment but this is an old man and Valeria decides not to marry him and to survive looking for job cleaning departments and friend Hilda ago Gianna falls ill and the doctor says Valeria need expensive treatment, while Hilda commits suicide and leaves power Valeria a letter.

Valeria reads the letter and decides to use it against Juan Francisco de Castro to blackmail him and make him marry her to pay for treatment of his sister, as Juan Francisco was the lover Hilda, same portraying him as responsible for his suicide. Before reaching the life of Juan Francisco, Valeria finds work in a couple's house very good people, and Teresa Vicente, who become friends and recommend Valeria Castro home.

After working at Juan Francisco, Valeria holds its plan and likewise discovers the opposition and enmity of Mercedes grandmother, uncle Hector and the wife of this, apart from Elena and Joseph Butler sinister mansion knows all the secrets of the old Mercedes and becomes the same helper in the task of removing Valeria their lives, Dulce cook becomes the mainstay of Valeria addition to Fanny, a friend of the family who discovers Valeria is the result of a love he had when he was admitted to a school in Naples. While Juan Francisco lives by Valeria resentful toward blackmail, gradually discovers that Valeria is the love of his life. The same applies to Valeria, who stops seeing Juan Francisco as a stranger and goes really falling for him.

Main cast
 Angélica María - Valeria Donatti
 Ricardo Blume - Juan Francisco de Castro
 Isabela Corona - María Mercedes de Castro
 Celia Castro - Fanny Iglesias del Campo
 Miguel Manzano - Vicente
 Nelly Meden - Analia de Castro
 Aarón Hernán - Patricio de Castro
 Silvia Pasquel - Gianna Donatti
 Rafael Banquells - Joseph
 Hortensia Santoveña - Teresa #1
 Alicia Montoya - Teresa #2
 María Rubio - Elena Harrington
 Socorro Avelar - Dulce
 Eduardo Alcaraz - Vittorio Maglione
 Héctor Gómez - Eduardo
 Javier Ruán - Héctor
 Magda Guzmán - Analia
 Lucía Méndez - Raquel
 Daniela Rosen - Cecilia
 César del Campo - Ricardo
 Martha Zavaleta - Carmen
 Alfonso Meza
 Héctor Flores - Chato
 Susana Dosamantes
 Ernesto Gómez Cruz - Humberto
 José Antonio Ferral - Jaime
 Atilio Marinelli - Príncipe Andrés de Orsini
 Joaquín Arizpe - Pedro
 Ignacio Rubiel - Nacho
 Raymundo Capetillo
 Cristina Moreno - Silvia
 Hector Saez - Luis Alberto

Additional cast members

Martha Zavaleta,  Alfonso Meza,  Héctor Flores, Lucía Méndez, Susana Dosamantes,  Ernesto Gómez Cruz,  Daniela Rosen,  Atilio Marinelli,  Héctor Gomez,  Javier Ruan,  Magda Guzmán and  Hortensia Santoveña.

Original version

Muchacha italiana viene a casarse  (1969, Argentina, Teleteatro) with Alejandra Da Passano and Rodolfo Ranni.

Remakes

There have been three  further remakes of "Muchacha italiana viene a casarse", which are:

Esa Provinciana  (1983, Argentina) with Camila Perisé and Juan José Camero.
Victoria  (1987, Mexico) with Victoria Ruffo and Juan Ferrara.
Muchacha italiana viene a casarse with Livia Brito and Jose Ron.

References

External links

1971 telenovelas
1971 Mexican television series debuts
1971 Mexican television series endings
Mexican telenovelas
Televisa telenovelas
Mexican television series based on Argentine television series
Spanish-language telenovelas
Television shows set in Mexico City